Rugova Canyon or Rugova Gorge is a river canyon near Peja in Western Kosovo, in the Accursed Mountains, close to the border with Montenegro. It was created by water erosion and the retreat of the Peja glacier. The Peja Bistrica river cuts through the canyon.

In 1985, Rugova Canyon was declared a protected monument of natural heritage due to its geological, hydrological, speleological and botanic values and its spectacular landscape.

Geography 

The canyon starts to narrow about three kilometres from Peja and continues to narrow for the next six kilometres, creating a steep valley which the river of Peja Bistrica flows through. It narrows again in an outfall along the western road of the region connecting Kosovo with Montenegro. The average depth of the valley is 650–1000 meters. The canyon is inhabited on its east side and also on its west side during the summer months.

There are a few waterfalls and many water-springs, such Uji i Zi (Black Water) and Kroi i km-5 (5-th Km Spring). In the sixth kilometer of the canyon there is a  waterfall that springs out from the cliffs on its southern side and drops to the river. Many hundreds of caves are to be found in the gorge with most of them still unexplored. Well known caves include Gryka e Madhe (the Great Canyon-cave system; which has around 11 km explored), Shpella e Karamakazit (Black Scissors cave) and Shpella e Kallabes (Kallaba Cave; where the archaeological remains of ancient humans have been found). A well known arch bridge connects the canyon, in front of which is a rock with a drawing of an athlete that is thought to be from the Pelasgian period.

Gryka e Madhe Cave 
The Gryka e Madhe (Great Canyon-cave) is located in the 8th kilometer of Rugova Canyon, in the left side, about 60 m above the Lumbardhi river, in the altitude 637 m.

Research in this cave started in 1993 when it was discovered in by Slovak speleologists who were traveling to Macedonia through the Rugova canyon. However, the cave was long known to local inhabitants before this. It has been identified that the cave's corridors are an oval profile, and it has the character of a continuously underground canyon with high walls. The highest levels of the cave do not have sediments, whilst the lower levels contain large, circular shaped rocks. Five levels of the cave have so far been explored. The first is at river level, which is 66 meters deep starting from its entrance. Different coloured sediments have been identified at this level. Due to its rough terrain and the high risk to people inside, the cave is rarely entered and is in a good state. Different teams of experts from Slovakia, Bulgaria, the NGO "Aragoniti" and KEPA have researched the cave.

Attractions  
Rugova Canyon offers great opportunities for hikers, rock-climbers and cave explorers. A "Via Ferrata", called the "Iron Trail", has been built. It is the first and the only one in the Balkans and enables hikers to climb rocks. The Patriarchate of Peja, the historical and spiritual seat of the Serbian Orthodox Church, is located at the entrance of the canyon.

See also 
 Rugova Mountains
 Rugova (sword dance)

Notes

References

External links 

 Rugova Travel Guide

Geography of Peja District
Canyons and gorges of Kosovo